A menu is a list of foods at a restaurant.

Menu may also refer to:
 Menu (computing), a list of options
 Menu key, on a keyboard
 Menu (film), 1933 American film
 The Menu (TV series), 2015 Hong Kong television series
 The Menu (2016 film), a Hong Kong film
 The Menu (2022 film), an American comedy horror film
 Menu Foods, a pet food company
 Operation Menu, a bombing campaign

People with the name 
 Alain Menu (born 1963), Swiss racing driver
 Bernadette Menu (born 1942), French Egyptologist
 Michel Menu (1916–2015), French engineer and author